Asar Zamin-e Kaliab (also Romanized as As̄ar Zamīn-e Kālīāb; also known as As̄ar Zamīn) is a village in Veysian Rural District, Veysian District, Dowreh County, Lorestan Province, Iran. At the 2006 census, its population was 64, in 15 families.

References 

Towns and villages in Dowreh County